Michael Matika (born 26 April 1983) is a South African former cricketer. He played in 22 first-class and 16 List A matches from 2003 to 2009.

References

External links
 

1983 births
Living people
South African cricketers
Border cricketers
Eastern Province cricketers
KwaZulu-Natal Inland cricketers
Sportspeople from Qonce